= Lingthem Monastery =

Religion
- Affiliation: Tibetan Buddhism

Location
- Location: Sikkim, India
- Country: India
- Interactive map of Lingthem Monastery
- Coordinates: 27.522°N 88.501°E

Lingthem Monastery is a Buddhist monastery in Sikkim, northeastern India.
